Primapus is an extinct genus of apodiform bird from the Early Eocene of the United Kingdom. Its fossils were found in the London Clay, which was deposited around 50 million years ago. The type species is P. lacki.

Sources
 Fossils (Smithsonian Handbooks) by David Ward (page 262)

External links
Primapus in the Paleobiology Database

Apodiformes
Eocene birds
Prehistoric birds of Europe